Semiothisa perfusaria, sometimes placed in the genus Godonela, is a moth of the family Geometridae. It is found in India, Malaysia, and Taiwan.

References

External links
 Images at Wikimedia

Moths of Asia
Moths described in 1866
Geometridae